The Acrididae are the predominant family of grasshoppers, comprising some 10,000 of the 11,000 species of the entire suborder Caelifera. The Acrididae are best known because all locusts (swarming grasshoppers) are of the Acrididae. The subfamily Oedipodinae is sometimes classified as a distinct family Oedipodidae in the superfamily Acridoidea. Acrididae grasshoppers are characterized by relatively short and stout antennae, and tympana on the side of the first abdominal segment.

Subfamilies

The Orthoptera Species File (September 2021) lists the following subfamilies of Acrididae. The numbers of genera and species are approximate and may change over time.
 Acridinae MacLeay, 1821  (140 genera, 470 species), Worldwide: temperate and tropical
 Calliptaminae Jacobson, 1905  (12 genera, 90 species), Africa, Europe, Asia
 Caryandinae Yin & Liu, 1987  (3 genera, 100 species), Africa, Asia
 Catantopinae Brunner von Wattenwyl, 1893  (325 genera, 990 species), Africa, Asia ("spur-throated grasshoppers")
 Copiocerinae Brunner von Wattenwyl, 1893  (22 genera, 90 species), Central & South America
 Coptacrinae Brunner von Wattenwyl, 1893  (20 genera, 110 species), Africa, Madagascar, tropical Asia
 Cyrtacanthacridinae Kirby, 1910  (38 genera, 170 species), Worldwide ("bird grasshoppers")
 Egnatiinae Bey-Bienko & Mistshenko, 1951  (30 species), Africa to central Asia
 Eremogryllinae Dirsh, 1956  (5 species), North Africa
 Eremogryllus Krauss, 1902
 Notopleura (grasshopper)  Krauss, 1902
 Euryphyminae Dirsh, 1956  (23 genera, 80 species), Africa including Madagascar
 Eyprepocnemidinae Brunner von Wattenwyl, 1893  (26 genera, 150 species), Africa, mainland Europe, Asia
 Gomphocerinae Fieber, 1853  (192 genera, 1200 species), Worldwide
 Habrocneminae Yin, 1982  (15 species), China, Indochina
 Habrocnemis Uvarov, 1930
 Longzhouacris You & Bi, 1983 - China only
 Menglacris Jiang & Zheng, 1994 (syn. Tectiacris Wei & Zheng, 2005)- China
 Hemiacridinae Dirsh, 1956  (45 genera, 180 species), Africa, Asia
 Incolacridinae Tinkham, 1940  (4 genera), East Asia
 Leptysminae Brunner von Wattenwyl, 1893  (21 genera, 70 species), Central and South America
 Marelliinae Eades, 2000  (monotypic, 1 species), South America
 Marellia Uvarov, 1929
 Melanoplinae Scudder, 1897  (146 genera, 1100 species), Americas, Eurasia
 Oedipodinae Walker, 1871  (138 genera, 790 species), Worldwide
 Ommatolampidinae Brunner von Wattenwyl, 1893  (115 genera, 290 species), South America
 Oxyinae Brunner von Wattenwyl, 1893  (33 genera, 210 species), Sub-Saharan Africa, Asia, Australasia
 Pauliniinae Hebard, 1923  (monotypic, 1 species), South America
 Pezotettiginae Brunner von Wattenwyl, 1893  (10 species), Europe, western Asia, Middle East
 Proctolabinae Amédégnato, 1974  (29 genera, 210 species), Central and South America
 Rhytidochrotinae Brunner von Wattenwyl, 1893  (20 genera, 40 species), South America
 Spathosterninae Rehn, 1957  (single tribe, currently with 3 genera and 12 species), Africa, Indomalaya, Australia
 Teratodinae Brunner von Wattenwyl, 1893  (8 genera, 20 species), Africa, southwest Asia
 Tropidopolinae Jacobson, 1905  (13 genera, 30 species), Africa, southern Europe, Asia

incertae sedis
 Tribe Eucopiocerini Descamps, 1975 - Central America
Chapulacris Descamps, 1975
Eucopiocera - monotypic E. rubripes Bruner, 1908
Halffterina Descamps, 1975
Leptalacris Descamps & Rowell, 1978 - monotypic L. fastigiata Descamps & Rowell, 1978
 unplaced genera:
Atopacris Amédégnato & Poulain, 1998
Castetsia Bolívar, 1902
Jumandiacris Amédégnato & Poulain, 1998
Melliacris Ramme, 1941
Palandella Amédégnato & Poulain, 1998
Pileolum Bolívar, 1917
Tylotropidiopsis Storozhenko, 1992
†Heeracris Zeuner, 1937
†Menatacridium Piton, 1936
†Taeniopodites Cockerell, 1909
†Tyrbula Scudder, 1885

See also
 List of Acrididae genera

References

External links

Orthoptera Species File (Version 5.0/5.0)

 
Orthoptera families
Taxa named by William Sharp Macleay